Kerry Spencer may refer to:

Kerry Spencer (murderer) (born 1980), American convicted murderer
Kerry Spencer (Emmerdale), fictional character on the television series Emmerdale

See also 
 List of people with surname Spencer